Arsdorf is a village in the commune of Rambrouch, in western Luxembourg.  , the village had a population of 261.

Arsdorf was a commune in the canton of Redange until 1 January 1979, when it was merged with the communes of Bigonville, Folschette, and Perlé to form the new commune of Rambrouch.  The law creating Rambrouch was passed on 27 July 1978.

See also
 List of villages in Luxembourg

Footnotes

Former communes of Luxembourg
Rambrouch
Villages in Luxembourg